Cabramatta is an electoral district of the Legislative Assembly in the Australian state of New South Wales. Its current member is Nick Lalich of the Labor Party.

Cabramatta is a 25.73 km2 urban electorate in Greater Western Sydney, centred on the suburb of Cabramatta from which it takes its name. It also includes the suburbs of Bonnyrigg, Bonnyrigg Heights, Cabramatta West, Canley Vale, Edensor Park, Greenfield Park, Lansvale, Mount Pritchard and St Johns Park.

History

The Cabramatta electorate was created in 1981, and has overwhelmingly voted  ever since its inception, as it lies in one of the city's most underprivileged areas, with poverty, drugs and crime ongoing issues. It remains one of the party's safest seats in New South Wales, and the conservative Liberal Party barely polls at all in the electorate. The minor multiculturalist Unity Party also polls well in the electorate due to the very high level of migrants in the area; Unity beat the Liberal Party by more than two thousand votes in 1999, though it slipped back to a narrow fourth in 2003.

The seat was held from 1981 to 1985 by inaugural member Eric Bedford, who served as Minister for Education and Minister for Planning in the Wran Labor government. He resigned on 1 December 1985, and was replaced by anti-drugs and anti-crime campaigner John Newman at the resulting by-election. Newman represented the electorate until 1994, when he became the victim of the only political assassination in Australia in recent history, killed by a Vietnamese crime boss. Reba Meagher was easily elected to replace Newman in the subsequent by-election and was the member for Cabramatta until her resignation in 2008. Meagher served as a minister in the Carr and Iemma governments, and polled more than 67% of the vote at the 2003 election. She resigned her seat on 16 September 2008, with the by-election following on 18 October.

Members for Cabramatta

Election results

References

Cabramatta
1981 establishments in Australia
Cabramatta